The 2013 Melon Music Awards were held on Thursday, November 14, 2013, at the Olympic Gymnastics Arena in Seoul, South Korea. Organized by Kakao M through its online music store Melon, the 2013 ceremony was the fifth edition of the event since its offline launch in 2009.

Performers

Winners and nominees

Main awards 
Winners and nominees are listed below. Winners are listed first and emphasized in bold.

Other awards

Gallery

References

External links 

 Official website

2013 music awards
Melon Music Awards ceremonies
Annual events in South Korea